Dźwiniacz may refer to the following places:

Dźwiniacz Dolny, Poland
Dźwiniacz Górny, Poland
 Dzvynyach, Ukraine